Kemetism (also Kemeticism; both from the Egyptian , usually voweled Kemet, the native name of ancient Egypt), also sometimes referred to as Neterism (from  (Coptic  noute) "deity"), or Kemetic paganism, is a neopaganism and revival of the ancient Egyptian religion and related expressions of religion in classical and late antiquity, emerging during the 1970s. A Kemetic is one who follows Kemetism.

There are several main groups, each of which takes a different approach to its beliefs, ranging from eclectic to reconstructionist; however, all of these can be identified as belonging to three strains, including: reconstructed Kemetism (adopting a philological and scholarly approach), a syncretic approach, and a more novel synthesis tending toward monotheism, Kemetic Orthodoxy.

Kemetism and Kemetists 

The movement's name is based on an endonym of Egypt, Kemet (the conventional vocalization of hieroglyphic notation km.t). The word is also sometimes written as Takemet, from the fuller tꜣ km.t. In translation from Egyptian it means "black" (or in longer form "black land"), which is derived from the black colour of the fertile mud brought by the Nile during the annual floods (currently no longer occurring due to the existence of the Aswan Dam).

Kemetists do not consider themselves direct descendants of the ancient Egyptian religion but consistently speak of its recreation or restoration. Some Kemetists or hermeticists claim direct continuity with secret societies allegedly continuously existing since the prohibition of Paganism by Roman emperor Theodosius I in  392 CE, or since the closing of the last functional Egyptian temple (of the goddess Isis on the island of Philae) by Emperor Justinian around 535. These claims are historically unprovable and are  mythical in nature.

Kemetism is a minority religion in terms of the number of its followers and its influence: the numbers of members or adherents of each group are indeterminate.

Relationship to tradition 

Kemetism is, in terms of its subject matter, a modern reflection of Ancient Egyptian religion, which was a supporting element of the entire ancient Egyptian culture. Reflection on ancient Egypt, however, has a very long tradition. Its roots can be safely traced back to the Hellenistic period, since when it has continuously developed in many streams (see Hermeticism) until the present day. It cannot be overlooked that it did not escape early and medieval Christianity, whether it takes the form of radical rejection, extra-biblical legends of the stay of Jesus in Egypt, the recognition of the authority of Hermes Trismegistos by the Church Fathers and Medieval philosophers, or the adaptation of myths associated with the goddess Isis.

The common feature of all these reflections is the more or less accentuated belief, referred to by Erik Hornung as Egyptosophy, that "mysterious Egypt is the cradle of a special esotericism" by which the highest "transcendence of cognition beyond the conventional framework of conceptual-logical thinking" can be achieved, because "Egypt was a land where gods lived among men, i.e. A land in which people were in direct contact with (hidden) natural forces which we (people of the modern age) have made the subjects of fairy tales." 

Surprisingly, however, this approach is not only found in authors sympathetic to esoterism, but also in the historical sphere, where it can take the form of interpretation update: "it seems (in fact) that the wholism of the ancient Egyptians is closely related to the latest natural science, to the world of quarks and bosons... In doing so, we encounter similar structures that suggest fruitful comparisons between, for example, quantum mechanics and Egyptian belief in gods."

Kemetism therefore stands as the youngest alongside other (and different) reflections on the same object, from which it differs in its emphasis on the religious aspect of the ancient Egyptian tradition. The others are usually devoted to other parts of it, such as "Egyptian wisdom" or magic and interprets the culture and religion itself and its gods symbolically, unlike Kemetism, in consequently, they reflect rather an "imaginary Egypt", i.e. "an idea (of Egypt) independent of time, which is only loosely related to the historical reality." In contrast, the goal of Kemetist groups is a more or less rigorous restoration of the religious system in its historical form, although Kemetists generally admit that a completely accurate imitation of ancient practices is not always possible or even advisable.

The degree of knowledge and understanding of the original ancient Egyptian thought plays an important role here, while their difficulty is due to the very nature of the subject: ancient Egyptian religion underwent complex transformations during the Pharaonic period, within which there was always "a multitude of approaches" and has always had its "local dimension", in which one and the same god could have different forms of cult in individual nomes or even individual temples and be involved in different mythological contexts. 

In this respect, it is quite dissimilar to the common tradition of Judaism and Christianity, and it is questionable to what extent the difference of traditions can be bridged with regard to the fact that Kemeticism develops in the area of Euro-American civilization. Due to its long development, moreover, one cannot speak of a purely "original" form of Egyptian religion that can be easily pointed to and reconstructed (see Reconstructionism), but only of its forms in certain historical periods.

The above-mentioned interpretive tradition, beginning in the Hellenistic period, did not merely adopt Egyptian religious ideas, but also fundamentally transformed them. At the same time, these new concepts may be far from the original drafts. So in view of this, the question arises whether this "second life" of theirs and the changes brought about by it should also belong to what the Kemetists are recovering, or whether they should instead be excluded as "traditions of antiquity and not of Egypt"; the attitude towards this question is one of the fundamental differences between the various groups. An illustration of this problem is the question of whether the gods should be strictly worshipped by their Egyptian names or whether they can also be addressed by their Greek versions; its significance within Kemeticism stems from the ancient Egyptian idea of the importance of name to existence.

Jeremy Naydler generally distinguishes two modes of religious reflection on the ancient Egyptian tradition: It can be conceived as a "re-stitching" consisting in "attempts to "return to Egypt" in nostalgic pursuit of a renewed state of "consciousness of the people of those times", or as an effort to "enter into conversation with the Egyptian experience" of spiritual life, by which, he argues, one can get closer to the spiritual roots of the modern world. These two points of view are hard to distinguish from each other.

Religious practice 

The conceptual content of the principle of maat implies the necessity of ritual worship of gods, possibly a universal divine force. The most common objects of veneration from the individual Old Egyptian gods today are mainly Amon, Isis and Osiris, Thoth, Sachmet, Bastet, Hathor, but of course one can also encounter others. In defining their nature, contemporary Kemetists are fairly consistent in adhering to the ancient tradition contained in the known mythology, modern mythological and theological works are as yet rare. In particular, there is hardly any theoretical and speculative theology in Kemetism, which is understandable on the one hand given the (more superficially seen) character of ancient Egyptian religious thought, on the other hand, thus Kemetism hardly formulates answers to problematic aspects of modern society.

The practice of religious ritual and other manifestations of religious life varies from individual associations. Its centrepiece, as in the original Old Egyptian religion, is usually a cult image, most often in the form of a statue or other representation depicting the likeness of the worshipped god. Its role in the cult may be conceptualized differently not only by different currents, but also by different individuals, with no precise boundaries between the different attitudes. 

In a schematic distinction, it can be said that the most widespread modernist Kemetism today generally attaches a more symbolic meaning to the cult image, understanding it as a means of enabling Kemetists to better focus on God (or divine power) as the proper object of veneration This concept is not dissimilar to the use of images in Catholicism. Consequently, there is no need to strictly observe a particular ritual procedure. 

The minority traditionalist current, on the other hand, understands the cult image as a real representation of the divine being in the human world. Therefore, in accordance with ancient Egyptian tradition, it may recommend its preservation in a special sacred container - nau, from which it is to be removed only in the course of a religious ritual, described as precisely as possible and strictly observed, of which the presentation of sacrifices is the most essential part. S in the absence of a binding doctrine, however, individual Kemetists may choose any combination of these aspects.

Although even in this case the religious reverence shown does not belong directly to the cult image as a physical thing, but to the worshipped god who is present in it in a special way, monotheistic religions raise the objection of idolatry in this context. Kemetism, however, regards it as inappropriate, since there is nothing within its framework that realistically corresponds to this notion. "The Egyptians (in fact) did not experience any marked separation of the psychic from the physical realm... (and therefore) the world of material objects could also be imbued with divine power... These could serve as effective mediums through which spiritual forces manifested themselves on the material plane... In ancient Egypt there was no such thing as idols, because the ancient Egyptian mentality could perceive no such thing. It was not until the Israelites created the idea of idols." 

In Egypt, as Stephan Quirke notes, any object could become more than a mere physical object by performing a special ceremony: it could "live permanently and thus open the way between this world and the world of the gods. The mummified body in a coffin, the cult image of a god, the statue of a king or a deceased nobleman, were all soulless objects that opening the mouth transformed into living forces, or, more precisely, into receptacles for the invisible and elusive force we call life."

Worship 

Followers of Kemetism generally worship a few gods (Maat, Bastet, Anubis, Sekhmet or Thoth, among others), but recognize the existence of every god. This worship generally takes the form of prayer, offerings and setting up altars, but there are no set guidelines for worship. Altars are most often constructed using a statue or two-dimensional representation of one or more given deities, as they serve as the focal point of worship. Other additional items include candles, votive offerings, prayer beads, incense burners, and one or more dishes for food offerings.

Principles of Kemetism

The idea of god/gods 

The looseness of the Kemetist doctrine (if that word can be used at all) is best captured just by defining the object of Kemetist religious veneration. Although the Egyptian religion was a polytheistic religion (though there are scholarly egyptologys now no longer accepted distinctly minority views that monotheism was always covertly present in the background of the plurality of worshipped gods) and Kemetists do not deny this formal polytheism, it can be interpreted differently by different currents.

Today, the minority definition of this problem is the traditionalist notion of individual gods as wholly individual beings with a separate cult that enter into the interactive relationships and agencies described in myths and legends. In accordance with the ancient Egyptian concept, any of the gods can be considered as the "supreme" or "most powerful" of the gods, analogically according to the mythological context that is currently referred to within the cult. The notion of a universal single god, if used at all, has a rather abstract meaning and is close in meaning to the philosophical notion of Gender: it is a designation of a particular divine quality forming "the defining feature of a group of beings of the same kind" -gods rather than individually existing beings.

In contemporary times, one can encounter within Kemeticism the prevalent, but somewhat more distant from the original ancient Egyptian conception, idea of a single universal divine force manifesting itself in various forms, which are the gods themselves, so that they are understood as somewhat separate but nevertheless mere aspects of it. In this case, the Kemetists follow the late antique henotheism as manifested, for example, in the cults of Serapis and Isis (originally the ancient Egyptian Isiss) or in the philosophical outlook in  Neo-Platonism, but like other neopagan movements, undeniably also to the Western experience of  Christian monotheism and its reflection in modern thought starting with the Enlightenment. 

Another variant of modernist Kemetism is monolatry, but based on the same sources. In these conceptions, leaving aside the external features derived from ancient Egyptian culture and the use of Egyptian mythological context, Kemetism in many respects bears a strong resemblance to, for example, the religion of Wicca; perhaps this is related to the fact that it is developed in areas with a predominantly Anglo-Saxon tradition.

Given this possible dualistic understanding of the object of religious veneration in Kemeticism, it is ultimately up to the individual to decide whether to focus more on an abstractly conceived divine power in the practice of his or her religion, or whether to prefer the more original worship of individual gods.

Virtually the only Czech Kemet website Temple of the Land of Kemet notes: "This does not mean that we deny that there is one universal deity, but we argue that it probably does not exist in the way monotheists imagine it, and that this does not necessarily imply a denial of a plurality of gods. Individual gods and goddesses in their multiplicity share this divinity in the same way that we humans share one universal 'humanity'. The gods ... represent certain types of energies and qualities. The universal 'one god' of the monotheists can hardly be present in a similar way." The same source elsewhere questions whether it is even possible to make this universal divine power itself an object of religious veneration, thus categorically rejecting any form of not only monotheism but also the aforementioned henotheism or monolatry. Czech Kemeticism would thus place itself in the traditionalist stream of this movement.

In both basic Kemetist conceptions of god/gods, the sun usually plays a non-negligible role: Regardless of whether it is worshipped as a god by particular Kemetists or not, as in Ancient Egypt is considered to be an analogous image of the divine power as the universal source of every single existence and of all existence in general.

Order 

Another important principle of Kemeticism is maat- order'. This concept was one of the cornerstones of (not only) religious thought of the Ancient Egyptians - its observance was supposed to ensure the stability of the world and its orderly running. Its importance is already evident from the fact that even the pharaoh, who was in a certain sense himself understood as a divine (i.e. exempt from the rules of the human world) being, was, from the end of the Old Kingdom at the latest, overridden by this principle; the main task of the ruler was to bear responsibility and to contribute to the observance of the maat by all his actions. The epitome of the concept in  Ancient Egyptian religion was the eponymous goddess Maat and its symbol - the ostrich feather.

The word maat itself is difficult to translate due to its complexity and combines concepts such as truth, harmony and stability or simply right action. It represents all that is right and necessary for the right course of things. It is the universal unchanging cosmic order encompassing the world of men and the world of gods and their interconnection as well as their interdependence. 

The expression of the functioning of the maat in the world of the gods is mainly myths and legends, in cosmic sense it is manifested in regular unchangeable and from human point of view eternal natural cycles (especially in solar and lunar cycles -  Therefore, the Egyptian gods Re and Thovt were referred to as Lord Maat'), in the human world in the existence of the state and in the proper functioning of its institutions, in the maintenance of social rules and, at the latest since the time of the New Empire, in personal human morality. 

As a result, in the Egyptian concept, the respect of rules of all kinds by each individual was merged into one with the support and maintenance of the cosmic order, while their non-observance (especially by the ruler, but not only by him) could lead to its disruption. The collapse of the maat would lead to the demise of the world and the victory of chaos (egypt isfet).

In this sense, the Kemetic movement refers to the generally prevailing traditional ethical ideas, to the "good manners" or customs in which "maat" in the human world naturally and more or less unquestionably shows itself. There is no explicitly binding text codifying moral norms. Instead, Kemetists are formally non-binding in their interpretation of the concept of maat in relation to human conduct, inspired by ancient Egyptian scriptures. 

The most prominent (though by no means the only) source for understanding maat in a more general social sense is the ancient Egyptian Books of Wise Advice for Life. Only chapter 125 of the Books of the Dead, containing the testimony of the deceased before the underworld court, by which he proves his moral purity by listing the deeds he did not commit (the so-called negative confession), is of a somewhat normative nature.

Since all these ancient texts are exclusively casuistic in nature, even Kemeticism does not (yet) contain any generally formulated theory of moral conduct. The Bohemian Temple of the Land of Kemet rather only marginally notes in this context: "Do not be subject to any extremes and choose the `middle way'" and "do not doubt that if you look after the interests of the gods, they will look after your interests."

Kemetic organizations

Kemetic Orthodoxy 

 Its concept is quite unlike the traditional Egyptian temple and shows inspiration from the interiors of Western Christianity. The most prominent Kemetic organization is probably the American Society of Kemetic Orthodoxy, founded in the 1980s. It brings together members from various states and, according to its own characterization, attempts to follow the Egyptian traditions as closely as possible and to revive them.

Entirely in this spirit, it is headed by an authority (currently Tamara Siuda) using some of the titles and other attributes of ancient pharaohs. She is conceived as the present incarnation of the royal ka, gold embedded in the spirit of Hora, an aspect of divinity embodied in the human form of a spiritual leader of the community.

On the other hand, it is in this movement that the departure from the traditionalist (i.e., closest to Egyptian religion) conception of god/gods, expressed in the concept of monolatry as official doctrine, is most pronounced.

Fellowship of Isis 

Another type of Kemetic organization is the Fellowship of Isis, formed in Ireland. It differs from most others in that, following the model of late antiquity in the henotheistic sense, it focuses on the cult of the goddess Isis, originally Egyptian goddesses Isis, transposed into ancient Greek and Roman settings. Egyptian traditions are therefore heavily modified in him by their Antic interpretation, by religious syncretism, and by modern multiculturalism.

Other Kemetist societies include The Living Nuhati, or the defunct French Ta Noutri.

Kemetism in the Czech Republic 
In the Czech Republic there is only one known society claiming to be a member of the Kemetism, the civic association Per Djoser Achet registered by the Ministry of the Interior. The activities of individual kemetists are evident mainly on the Internet.

Atonist Kemetism 
Atonistic Kemeticism (or Atonian Kemeticism) is a rather specific Kemetic movement, inspired by Atonianism. This form of Egyptian religion existed only during the brief reign of Akhenaten, during whose reign all other Egyptian cults were banned and only Aten was allowed. In antiquity, this religious reform was unsuccessful and ceased shortly after Akhenaten's death. Akhenaten himself remains a controversial figure to this day. 

Opinions of him range from a rejected heretic and ruler who should never have become a pharaoh to a great reformer and visionary who was not understood in his own time. It is from this other end of the spectrum that there are those who seek to restore, to reconstruct, the very image of Akhenaten's Egyptian religion and bring this reformist religion of his into the present (see Athonite references).

Reconstructing Atonism is complicated, however, by the fact that the Egyptians themselves tried to erase this part of their history, and there are almost no remains of Akhetaton outside of Akhenaten. The most important source is Akhenaten's Hymn to the Sun, as well as inscriptions preserved from the Egyptian Temple of Aten at Akhetaton and from the tombs of the nobles and dignitaries of the Akhetaton court.

See also
 Egyptian mythology
 Hermeticism
 List of Neopagan movements
 Neopaganism
 Temple of Set - an unrelated religion, centered around the Egyptian god Set.

Notes

References

 Marilyn C. Krogh; Brooke Ashley Pillifant, Kemetic Orthodoxy: Ancient Egyptian Religion on the Internet: A Research Note, Sociology of Religion (2004).
Ellen Cannon Reed, Circle of Isis: Ancient Egyptian Magic for Modern Witches (2002), .
J. G. Melton, Encyclopedia of American Religions, 5th ed., Detroit (1996).

External links

 
Modern pagan traditions
Modern paganism in the United States
Polytheistic reconstructionism
1970s in modern paganism